Democratic Party of Nigeria and the Cameroons was a Nigerian political party formed in August 1958. The party was an offshoot of a N.C.N.C reform committee headed by Tobi Izedonmi which waged an unsuccessful challenge to the leadership of Nnamdi Azikiwe. The resulting schism with the political leaders of the dominant Igbo party did not translate to overwhelming grass root support. However, the party was considerably known in the Orlu and Onitsha districts.

References
K. W. J. Post; The Nigerian Federal Election of 1959: Politics and Administration in a Developing Political System, Oxford University Press, 1963

Defunct political parties in Nigeria
Political parties established in 1958
1958 establishments in Nigeria